The 1843 United States Senate election in Pennsylvania was held on January 10, 1843. Future President of the United States James Buchanan was re-elected by the Pennsylvania General Assembly to the United States Senate.

Results
The Pennsylvania General Assembly, consisting of the House of Representatives and the Senate, convened on January 10, 1843, to elect a new Senator to fill the term beginning on March 4, 1843. Incumbent Democrat James Buchanan, who was elected in 1834 and re-elected in 1836, was a successful candidate for re-election to another term. The results of the vote of both houses combined are as follows:

|-
|-bgcolor="#EEEEEE"
| colspan="3" align="right" | Totals
| align="right" | 132
| align="right" | 100.00%
|}

See also 
 United States Senate elections, 1842 and 1843

References

External links
Pennsylvania Election Statistics: 1682-2006 from the Wilkes University Election Statistics Project

1843
Pennsylvania
United States Senate